Juha Iisakki Mieto (born 20 November 1949) is a Finnish former cross-country skier, who was born in Kurikka. He competed in the 1972, 1976, 1980 and 1984 Olympics and won five medals, including a gold medal in the 4 × 10 km relay in 1976. He also placed fourth three times, losing the 15 km bronze medal in 1972 by 0.06 seconds. He finished second in this event in 1980 in the closest-ever margin of victory in Olympic cross-country skiing, 0.01 seconds, which led the International Ski Federation (FIS) to round all of their times to the nearest 1/10 second in future competitions. Mieto was selected as the Finnish flag bearer at the 1972 Winter Olympics.

Mieto won four medals at the FIS Nordic World Ski Championships, with silvers in the 30 km (1974) and the 4 × 10 km relay (1978), and bronzes in the 15 km (1978) and the 4 × 10 km relay (1982, tied with East Germany). His biggest success as a cross-country skier was at the Holmenkollen ski festival where he won the 50 km once (1973) and the 15 km five times (1973–1975, 1977–1978). He received the Holmenkollen medal in 1974.

After retiring from competitions in 1984 Mieto worked in public relations for several organizations, including Nordea Bank, Kuortane Sports Resort and World Vision. In the 2007 Finnish parliament elections he was a Centre Party candidate in Vaasa constituency. He was elected with 13,768 votes, which was the seventh best result in Finland that year.

Cross-country skiing results

All results are sourced from the International Ski Federation (FIS).

Olympic Games
 5 medals – (1 gold, 2 silver, 2 bronze)

World Championships
 4 medals – (2 silver, 2 bronze)

World Cup

Season standings

Individual podiums

1 podium

Team podiums
 2 podiums 

Note:   Until the 1999 World Championships and the 1994 Olympics, World Championship and Olympic races were included in the World Cup scoring system.

References

External links
 
 
Holmenkollen medalists – click Holmenkollmedaljen for downloadable pdf file 
Holmenkollen winners since 1892 – click Vinnere for downloadable pdf file 
 Official home page 

1949 births
Living people
People from Kurikka
Centre Party (Finland) politicians
Members of the Parliament of Finland (2007–11)
Cross-country skiers at the 1972 Winter Olympics
Cross-country skiers at the 1976 Winter Olympics
Cross-country skiers at the 1980 Winter Olympics
Cross-country skiers at the 1984 Winter Olympics
Finnish male cross-country skiers
Holmenkollen medalists
Holmenkollen Ski Festival winners
Olympic cross-country skiers of Finland
Olympic medalists in cross-country skiing
FIS Nordic World Ski Championships medalists in cross-country skiing
Olympic gold medalists for Finland
Olympic silver medalists for Finland
Olympic bronze medalists for Finland
Medalists at the 1984 Winter Olympics
Finnish sportsperson-politicians
Medalists at the 1976 Winter Olympics
Medalists at the 1980 Winter Olympics
20th-century Finnish people